The 2004 European Junior and U23 Canoe Slalom Championships took place in Kraków, Poland from 10 to 12 September 2004 under the auspices of the European Canoe Association (ECA) at the Kraków-Kolna Canoe Slalom Course. It was the 6th edition of the competition for Juniors (U18) and the 2nd edition for the Under 23 category. It was also the first time that the two age categories had a joint European Championships. A total of 12 medal events took place. The team events were held as an open event for both junior and U23 athletes. Countries were allowed to enter two teams in each team event.

Medal summary

Men

Canoe

Junior

U23

Kayak

Junior

U23

Women

Kayak

Junior

U23

Medal table

References

External links
European Canoe Association

European Junior and U23 Canoe Slalom Championships
European Junior and U23 Canoe Slalom Championships